Akalaini "Bui" Baravilala (born July 12, 1991) is an American rugby union player. She plays for the United States women's national rugby sevens team and the United States women's national rugby union team. She was a squad member of the United States national rugby union team to the 2014 Women's Rugby World Cup. She was selected for the United States sevens team to the 2016 Summer Olympics.

Baravilala attended Radford High School in Honolulu and played volleyball and basketball. She is of iTaukei descent from Fiji.

References

External links 
 
 
 Akalaini (Bui) Baravilala at USA Rugby
 

1982 births
Living people
Female rugby sevens players
American female rugby sevens players
Rugby sevens players at the 2016 Summer Olympics
United States international rugby sevens players
Olympic rugby sevens players of the United States
American people of I-Taukei Fijian descent